Stewart Nyamayaro is a Zimbabwean socialite and music promoter. He contributed to the growth of the Zimdancehall genre.

Nyamayaro was born April 20th, 2000, in Harare, Zimbabwe. Nyamayaro started music promotion online mostly through YouTube and he has the most followed YouTube channel in Zimbabwe. In 2017, he became a manager for music artists, and he has managed several award-winning artists in Zimbabwe including Fungisai, Soul Jah Love, Enzo Ishall, Holy Ten and socialite Passion Java.

In 2019, in recognition for his contribution in the growth of Zimdancehall genre in Zimbabwe by producers, a riddim instrumental was produced in his name titled Stewart Nyamayaro Riddim and 63 artists officially recorded on it. along with several others. In 2020, Stewart Nyamayaro won best online media at the 2020 Zimdancehall awards.

Controversy
In March 2019, Stewart Nyamayaro was involved in a copyright dispute with Sly Media, a digital content company, and his channel was temporarily closed on YouTube for 14 days.

References

Living people
1997 births